Paul Lawrence Vincent Esswood (born 6 June 1942) is an English countertenor and conductor. He is best known for his performance of Bach cantatas and the operas of Handel and Monteverdi. Along with his countrymen Alfred Deller and James Bowman, he led the revival of countertenor singing in modern times.

Life and career
Paul Esswood was born in West Bridgford, England.  He studied at the Royal College of Music in London from 1961 to 1964 after which he sang in the choir of Westminster Abbey. His professional debut was in a performance of Handel's Messiah for the BBC (1971).

Esswood has participated in over 150 recordings, including the alto parts of many Bach cantatas in the complete Teldec series by conductors Nikolaus Harnoncourt and Gustav Leonhardt. He has recorded Messiah four times, as well as extended works by Henry Purcell, Claudio Monteverdi, Francesco Cavalli, Marc-Antoine Charpentier and others. Among the roles in contemporary works written for Esswood are the title role in Philip Glass's Akhnaten and Death in Penderecki's Paradise Lost. He also sang in the première of Schnittke's Second Symphony.

Paul Esswood is a co-founder of Pro Cantione Antiqua, an all-male a cappella group specializing in early music. He is also establishing a reputation as a conductor of Baroque opera.

References

External links
Short biography at Bach-Cantatas.com
Official website of Paul Esswood
Paul Esswood sings Bach

1942 births
Living people
Operatic countertenors
Alumni of the Royal College of Music
People from West Bridgford
Honorary Members of the Royal Academy of Music
People educated at West Bridgford School